Sky News at 10 (previously branded Sky News at Ten, and now usually News at 10) is a long-running nightly news programme on Sky News, airing between 10:00 pm and 10:30 pm. It is a half-hour round-up of the day's top stories with analysis of their possible impact from the channel's specialists. The show is presented by Anna Botting from Monday to Thursday and Gillian Joseph from Friday to Sunday.

Sky News at Ten

History
The show was originally launched on 8 March 1999 following the axe of ITV's News at Ten. Originally, the show used its own special version of the Sky News graphics and a unique mix of the Sky News theme music, and was presented by Bob Friend and Anna Botting.

Over the years, the programme has been presented by many of Sky's presenters; since February 2007, Anna Botting has presented the broadcast on weeknights. It is currently followed at 10:30pm by the Press Preview, where the next morning's newspapers are discussed with two guests.

From late September 2016, the Friday to Sunday slot will be filled by Anna Jones, who previously filled in as Anna Botting's maternity cover and as a relief presenter.

The show was rebranded in January 2017 with a new look focused around Big Ben. This change came as ITV News at Ten was pushed back to 10:30 pm temporarily to make way for The Nightly Show, a light entertainment programme.

In April 2021, Anna Jones moved to present The Daily Climate Show on weekday evenings and in Summer 2021 Gillian Joseph became the main presenter of weekend editions.

The show's presenter presents from 9:00 pm until midnight, presenting Sky News at 9, the Press Preview at 10:30 pm and 11:30 pm and the News & Press Preview at 11:00 pm. At weekends, the presenter also presents the 8:00 pm hour on the channel and headlines at 11:00pm.

Presenters

Current presenters

Sky News at 11/Press Preview

The Sky News at 10 presenter also presents the 11 pm hour of Sky News. From Monday to Friday, the hour is branded as News & Press Preview. At weekends, the 11 pm hour is currently unbranded and uses the generic Sky News brand.

On weekdays, the first thirty minutes features news reports and analysis from correspondents and the Press Preview; there is then a second shorter edition of the Press Preview which focuses on stories not discussed earlier on during the hour. The final part features a pre-recorded sports update and weather.

At weekends, the programme generally using the same running order as Sky News at Ten with the addition of a sports update. The slot uses the same backdrop as Sky News at 9 as opposed to the Sky News at 10 backdrop however. The back half hour is followed by a second daily edition of Press Preview. This 11:30 pm edition is repeated during the back half hours of the Sky News from midnight until 3 am. It is also broadcast once more at 5:30 am.

Current presenters

References

1999 British television series debuts
2000s British television series
2010s British television series
2020s British television series
Sky News
Sky UK original programming
Sky television news shows